Monophylla is a genus of checkered beetles in the family Cleridae. There are at least four described species in Monophylla.

Species
These four species belong to the genus Monophylla:
 Monophylla californica (Fall, 1901)
 Monophylla cinctipennis Chevrolat, 1874
 Monophylla pallipes Schaeffer, 1908
 Monophylla terminata (Say, 1835)

References

Further reading

 
 
 

Tillinae
Articles created by Qbugbot